Patrick L. Touhy (1839–1911) of Chicago, born in Ireland was a real estate developer instrumental in the subdividing and development of the Rogers Park section of Chicago.  Touhy Avenue is named after him.

References

Businesspeople from Chicago
Irish emigrants to the United States (before 1923)
1839 births
1911 deaths
19th-century American businesspeople